The Renew Democracy Initiative (RDI) is a non-partisan organization committed to identifying and combating threats to freedom in the U.S. and around the world.  Although based on a moderate political perspective, its leadership consists of individuals from a variety of ideological backgrounds and it has published content spanning the political spectrum. It was founded in 2017 by former World Chess Champion and Russian dissident Garry Kasparov, and its board is made up of people ranging from center-left to center-right including Senators Heidi Heitkamp and Bob Kerrey, Pulitzer Prize-winners Bret Stephens and Anne Applebaum, Congressman Mickey Edwards, former RNC Chairman Michael Steele, and former World Poker Champion Annie Duke, among others.

Overview
RDI was founded in the months following the 2016 United States presidential election to strengthen liberal democracy by bringing together the center-left and center-right. Over 120 prominent thinkers and leaders have signed RDI’s Values Statement promoting and defending democracy at home and abroad, including Dambisa Moyo, Scott Turow, Larry David, Stephen Fry, José María Aznar, Norman Foster, Natan Sharansky, Mario Vargas Llosa, Bret Stephens, and Bill Kristol. Currently, RDI’s key priorities are rallying support for Ukraine against Vladimir Putin and leveraging the voices of dissidents to defend key freedoms in the U.S. under its Frontlines of Freedom initiative.

Projects

Fight for Liberty 
In October 2018, RDI released its inaugural publication, Fight for Liberty. Taking inspiration from The Federalist Papers, the book features a collection of essays by contributors allied with RDI’s mission and values. Kirkus Reviews wrote, "The strongest point of this useful collection is the depth and breadth of its opposition to our current illiberal atmosphere...A valuable addition to the literature of democratic resistance."

Conferences 
On March 14, 2019, RDI hosted a conference entitled "Reawakening the Spirit of Democracy" at Johns Hopkins University. Featured speakers included Democratic Senators Ben Cardin and Heidi Heitkamp, former Republican House Majority Leader Eric Cantor, political strategist Donna Brazile, and journalist Bret Stephens.

In October 2019, RDI hosted a second event at Hunter College titled "Democracy in America: Is Everyone In?". The conference addressed the current state of political polarization and extremism in the US, and featured RDI Chairman Garry Kasparov and CEO of Generation Citizen, Scott Warren.

With the start of the COVID-19 pandemic, RDI transitioned to hosting primarily virtual events including: a briefing on the war in Ukraine with Ukrainian Foreign Minister Dmytro Kuleba in 2022, a joint event between RDI the online magazine Persuasion to celebrate citizen journalism in 2021, and a conversation on restoring civic duty & civility with Cindy McCain, Heidi Heitkamp, and Anne Applebaum in 2020.

Russian Invasion of Ukraine 
In 2022, the group became known for releasing content rallying Western democratic nations to support Ukraine in light of Vladimir Putin's 2022 invasion of Ukraine. RDI entered the national conversation by countering Putin’s disinformation, placing op-eds in media outlets, launching the Winter is Here podcast, developing a sanctions tracking website, hosting events with stakeholders including Ukrainian soldiers,  American experts, and the Ukrainian Foreign Minister, and partnering with General Ben Hodges, former commander of the U.S. Army in Europe, to produce a video series on the war in Ukraine.

Frontlines of Freedom 
In the fall of 2021, RDI partnered with CNN to create Voices of Freedom, a limited series featuring foreign political dissidents’ perspective on American democracy. The community featured in the series has grown to 119 dissidents from 39 countries. It is organized by RDI’s director of education, Zimbabwean political activist Evan Mawarire. 

Frontlines of Freedom initiatives include an intersession course taught at Johns Hopkins University in 2022 & 2023; dissident speaking engagements at the University of Pennsylvania, Purdue University, Dartmouth College, Johns Hopkins University, and Yale; dissidents-in-residence programs at universities;  a Global Democracy Ambassador Scholarship; and the creation of written and  video content amplifying dissident messages in mainstream discourse.

Humanitarian Support for Ukraine 
Since February 2022, RDI has been a leading organization supporting Ukraine’s people.  Through its Gift of Warmth campaign, RDI has provided direct humanitarian aid  including over 100,000 Meals Ready-to-Eat (MREs) and 15,000 sleeping bags. RDI has also funded the construction of portable water filtration units that provide clean water for up to 30,000 people each day.

Leadership
Uriel Epshtein is RDI’s executive director, with Former Senator Heidi Heitkamp sitting as the organization's president and Garry Kasparov as its Chairman. Additionally, RDI’s Board of Directors include Senator Bob Kerrey, Annie Duke, Igor Kirman, Linda Chavez, Michael Steele, Congressman Mickey Edwards and Retired Lieutenant Colonel Alexander Vindman. RDI's Advisory Board includes Anne Applebaum, Bill Kristol, Bret Stephens, Dan Benton, Daniel Hurwitz, Eric Wolf, Karl-Theodor zu Guttenberg, Lisa Berg, Lucy Caldwell, Max Boot, Mark Lasswell, Rachel Vindman, Rina Shah, General Stanley McChrystal, and Whitney Haring-Smith.

See also

Bipartisanship
Centrism
Idealism in international relations

References

External links
Renew Democracy - Twitter.com

Centrist political advocacy groups in the United States
Criticism of Donald Trump
Political organizations established in 2017
Russian activists against the 2022 Russian invasion of Ukraine